The Delian Society was an international community of composers, performers, academics, independent scholars, recording engineers, music publishers, and amateurs dedicated to revitalizing and promoting tonality in contemporary art music. The society was founded on 23 January 2004 by American composer Joseph Dillon Ford and takes its name from the Greek Island of Delos, legendary birthplace of Apollo, god of music and light. Members have collaborated in producing an ongoing series of Delian Suites for various soloists and ensembles.

Members
As of 2010, the society's members included:
Michael Conway Baker
Elisabetta Brusa
Jean Chatillon
Grant Colburn
Joseph Dillon Ford
Edward Gold
Anthony Linden Jones
Roman Turovsky-Savchuk

References

External links
Official site
Yahoo Group

Music organizations based in the United States
Contemporary music organizations
Historicist composers